Martin Wood (born 24 June 1970) is a former professional rugby league footballer who played in the 1980s, 1990s and 2000s who played as a stand-off or loose forward for Halifax, Scarborough Pirates, Keighley Cougars, Sheffield Eagles and Workington Town.

Career
Wood started his career at Halifax, helping the club achieve promotion from the Second Division in 1990–91. He was deemed surplus to requirements during the following season, and was sold to Scarborough Pirates in October 1991. Wood then joined Keighley Cougars in 1992.

In January 1997, Wood and his team-mate Nick Pinkney were signed by Super League side Sheffield Eagles in exchange for £95,000 plus Mark Gamson. He spent two seasons at Sheffield. Wood was as an interchange/substitute in Sheffield Eagles' 17-8 victory over Wigan in the 1998 Challenge Cup Final during Super League III at Wembley Stadium, London on Saturday 2 May 1998.

He returned to Keighley in 1999. During his second spell at the club, he was named the Northern Ford Premiership Player of the Year in 2000, and reached a career total of 1,000 points in January 2001. He finished his professional career with Workington Town in 2002. He continued playing and coaching rugby at amateur level, helping Sharlston Rovers achieve a shock win against Dewsbury Rams in the third round of the 2004 Challenge Cup.

In 2011, Wood was inducted into Keighley's Hall of Fame.

Personal
In 2009, Wood emigrated to Australia with wife Joanne and daughters Megan and Ellie.

References

External links
 Profile at sheffieldeagles.com

1970 births
Living people
Halifax R.L.F.C. players
Keighley Cougars players
Rugby league five-eighths
Rugby league locks
Sheffield Eagles (1984) players
Workington Town coaches
Workington Town players